Three ships of the Royal Navy have been named HMS Adamant:

 was a 50-gun fourth rate launched in 1780. She was reduced to harbour service in 1809 and was broken up in 1814.
 was a submarine depot ship launched in 1911, commissioned in 1912 and sold in 1932.
 was a submarine depot ship launched in 1940 and broken up in 1970.

See also
 The  sloop  was renamed HMS Adamant II in 1930, and was sold later that year. 
  is a small submarine tender and personnel ferry in the Royal Maritime Auxiliary Service. She was launched in 1992 and is currently in service.

References

Royal Navy ship names